Dium is a Latinisation of Greek Dion, and may refer to:

Dion, Pieria, in modern Greece
Dium (Chalcidice), a city of ancient Chalcidice, now on Mount Athos
Dium (Coele-Syria), a city of ancient Coele-Syria, now in Jordan or Syria
Dium (Crete), a city of ancient Crete, Greece
Dium (Euboea), a town of ancient Euboea, Greece
Dium (Pisidia), a town of ancient Pisidia, now in Turkey
Dium (Thessaly), a town of ancient Thessaly, Greece